Kamiel Bonneu (born 1 August 1999) is a Belgian racing cyclist, who currently rides for UCI ProTeam .

Major results
2017
 5th La Philippe Gilbert Juniors
2021
 7th Liège–Bastogne–Liège Espoirs
2022
 1st Stage 3 Tour of Britain
 1st Stage 3 Sazka Tour
 5th Volta Limburg Classic
 10th Overall Tour de Hongrie
 10th Classic Loire Atlantique

References

External links

1999 births
Living people
Belgian male cyclists
People from Hamont-Achel
Cyclists from Limburg (Belgium)
21st-century Belgian people